"The Great Secret" is a science fiction story written by L. Ron Hubbard. It was originally published in April, 1943 in the pulp fiction magazine Science Fiction Stories.

Plot introduction
The story revolves around Fanner Marston who as a slave child turned petty thief, evolves into a hard core, viciously greedy and power hungry individual who will stop at nothing to obtain what he wants. Marston leads a crew of forty men on a desperate trek across a blistering hot desert to find the magical city of Parva where legend tells of a secret that will give one ultimate and absolute control over the universe.  Marston, the only one to make it to Parva, discovers that having all power is not at all what he was expecting.

Publication history
"The Great Secret" was written and published in April 1943 of Science Fiction Stories/Future Science Fiction magazine.

The Great Secret is from the Golden Age series which Galaxy Press started re-publishing in 2008. The book has been re-released in paperback, with glossaries, and author bio. It is also available as a full-cast audiobook, with full sound effects and music, featuring Bruce Boxleitner, Lynsey Bartilson, R.F. Daley, Jim Meskimen, Josh Robert Thompson, and Chuck White.

Further reading 
 

1943 short stories
Works by L. Ron Hubbard
Science fiction short stories